Maqsud (also spelled Maqsood) (مقصود) is a given name. Notable people with the name include:

 Maqsood Ahmed, Pakistani cricketer
 Sayed Maqsood Hashemi, Afghan footballer
 Maqsood Hussain, Pakistani field hockey player
 Maqsood Rana, Pakistani cricketer
 Ala Abdel Maqsud Muhammad Salim, citizen of Egypt who was held in extrajudicial detention in Guantanamo Bay
 Maqsud Shah, Uyghur Khan or Prince of the Kumul Khanate from 1908 to 1930
 Maqsud-Ali Tabrizi, Iranian physician
 Maqsudullah, Bengali Islamic scholar

Pakistani masculine given names